Uusküla may refer to several places in Estonia:

Uusküla, Harju County, village in Jõelähtme Parish, Harju County
Uusküla, Ida-Viru County, village in Alajõe Parish, Ida-Viru County
Uusküla, Lääne County, village in Martna Parish, Lääne County
Uusküla, Lääne-Viru County, village in Vihula Parish, Lääne-Viru County
Uusküla, Rapla County, village in Rapla Parish, Rapla County